Brymela tutezona is a species of mosses in the family Pilotrichaceae. It is endemic to Panama.  Its natural habitat is subtropical or tropical moist lowland forests. It is threatened by habitat loss.

References

Flora of Panama
Hookeriales
Critically endangered plants
Taxonomy articles created by Polbot